Ivan Matić (born 30 April 1971) is a retired Croatian professional footballer and manager, who last managed NK Solin.

Club career
Matić began his career in the Yugoslav First League with Hajduk Split. He had a spell with Chaves in the Portuguese Liga, before returning to Croatia to play for NK Marsonia in the Prva HNL.

Managerial career
He was succeeded as manager of Rudeš in October 2018 by Marko Lozo and took the reigns at Solin in October 2020. Matić then resigned in October 2021 and replaced Boris Pavić as manager of HNK Sloga Mravince in February 2022.

References

External links
 
 

1971 births
Living people
Footballers from Split, Croatia
Association football midfielders
Croatian footballers
HNK Hajduk Split players
Wuhan Guanggu players
G.D. Chaves players
HŠK Posušje players
NK Marsonia players
First Vienna FC players
Croatian Football League players
Primeira Liga players
Croatian expatriate footballers
Expatriate footballers in China
Croatian expatriate sportspeople in China
Expatriate footballers in Portugal
Croatian expatriate sportspeople in Portugal
Expatriate footballers in Austria
Croatian expatriate sportspeople in Austria
Croatian football managers
RNK Split managers
NK Rudeš managers
NK Solin managers